The 1934 Albanian National Championship was the fifth season of the Albanian National Championship, the top professional league for association football clubs.

Overview

The Championship was contested by 7 teams. KF Tirana won the championship for the fourth time in its history.

League standings

Results

References
Albania - List of final tables (RSSSF)

Kategoria Superiore seasons
1
Albania
Albania